The 31st Actors and Actresses Union Awards ceremony was held on 13 March 2023 at the Circo Price in Madrid.

In addition to the competitive awards, the Ministry of Equality received the '' award, whilst Lola Herrera  was bestowed the '' life achievement career award.

Winners and nominees 
The winners and nominees are listed as follows:

Film

Television

Theatre

Newcomers

International productions

References 

Actors and Actresses Union Awards
2023 in Madrid
2022 television awards
Actors
2022 theatre awards
March 2023 events in Spain